Doljani is a village in Croatia.

Population

According to the 2011 census, Doljani had 133 inhabitants.

Note: Until 1931, the name of the settlement was Doljane. From 1857-1880 part of the data is included in the settlement of Dobroselo. Data from census years 1857-1931 (from 1857-1880 data is just calculated) is not totally included for the current part of the settlement (hamlet) of Martin Brod which before World War II was part of Croatia and after the war and small territorial changes and border corrections between that time Yugoslav federal units of Croatia and Bosnia and Herzegovina in the border region in eastern Lika and northwestern Bosnia, became part of Bosnia and Herzegovina.

1991 census

According to the 1991 census, settlement of Doljani had 305 inhabitants, which were ethnically declared as this:

Austro-hungarian 1910 census

According to the 1910 census, settlement of Doljani had 1,909 inhabitants in 11 hamlets, which were linguistically and religiously declared as this:

In 1910. census hamlet of Martin-brod was also part of settlement Doljani. After World War II it became a part of neighbouring settlement with same name Martin Brod in Bosnia and Herzegovina, and data for that hamlet in 1910 census was:

Literature 

  Savezni zavod za statistiku i evidenciju FNRJ i SFRJ, popis stanovništva 1948, 1953, 1961, 1971, 1981. i 1991. godine.
 Knjiga: "Narodnosni i vjerski sastav stanovništva Hrvatske, 1880-1991: po naseljima, autor: Jakov Gelo, izdavač: Državni zavod za statistiku Republike Hrvatske, 1998., ;

References

Populated places in Lika-Senj County